Mykola Stakhovsky (Микола Стаховський) (May 22, 1879 in Stetkivtsi, Zhytomyr oblast – December 7, 1948 in Prague) – is a Ukrainian diplomat, politician, medic. Head of the Ukrainian mission to the United Kingdom (1919).

Education 
Mykola Stakhovsky graduated from Warsaw University, faculty of medical (1904).

Career 
In 1904 - 1905 - he served with the Red Cross in the northeastern Chinese city of Shenyang.

In 1906 - he published ″Borotba″, an official periodical publication of the Ukrainian Social Democratic Labour Party in Kyiv.

In 1906 - 1908 - he continued his medical studies in Paris

In 1909 - 1914 - he practised medicine in Vinnytsia.

In 1914 - 1917 - he continued his medical career in Proskuriv.

In May 1917 - after the establishment of the Ukrainian Central Rada, he was appointed provincial commissioner of Podillia.

28 January 1919 to September 1919 - he was as the first head of the diplomatic mission of the Ukrainian People's Republic in London

In 1920 - 1922 - he continued his practised medicine in Paris and in Berlin.

In 1924 - 1939 - he practised medicine in Berehovo, where he was also one of the leading organizers of Ukrainian cultural life.

In 1939 - 1945 - he practised in Rumburk, Czechoslovakia.

December 7, 1948 - died in Prague and is buried in the Olšany Cemetery.

References

External links
 Olsanske hrbitovy. Prague Capital City, Czech Republic
 Ukrainians in the United Kingdom Online encyclopaedia
 Mykola Stakhovsky

1879 births
1948 deaths
People from Zhytomyr Oblast
People from Volhynian Governorate
University of Warsaw alumni
Podolia Voivodeship
Ambassadors of Ukraine to the United Kingdom
20th-century Ukrainian physicians